Keith Allan, FAHA (born 27 March 1943) is an Australian linguist and Emeritus Professor at Monash University.

Allan sees language as a form of social interactive behaviour and believes this to be an important consideration in any thorough account of meaning in natural language. While he is interested in all aspects of meaning in language, his main interests are semantics, pragmatics, linguistic meta-theory and the history and philosophy of linguistics.

Biography

Early life
After schooling in London, Allan went to do drama at University of Leeds, but once there, took up linguistics instead, receiving a BA (Hons) in 1964. From Leeds, he went to Ghana and then to the University of Edinburgh as a research associate where he completed an MLitt in 1970. After three years as a lecturer in the English language at Ahmadu Bello University in Nigeria, he returned to the UK as a lecturer in linguistics at the University of Essex. Then after three more years at the University of Nairobi in Kenya, he signed up for a doctorate at Edinburgh on NP countability, receiving his PhD in 1978. He arrived at Monash University in 1978, where – but for a year in Tucson at the University of Arizona and a few odd months elsewhere – he has stayed until his retirement in 2011.

Career

Currently the co-editor of Australian Journal of Linguistics with Jean Mulder, Allan has published articles in refereed journals, books and conference proceedings. He was semantics editor for both editions of the International Encyclopedia of Linguistics, as well as section editor for "Logical and Lexical Semantics" in the Encyclopedia of Language and Linguistics. He also edited the 2001 and 2006 conference proceedings for the Australian Linguistic Society.

In 2003, Allan received the Centenary Medal "For service to Australian society and the humanities in linguistics and philology".

In the early years of Open Learning Australia, Allan helped develop some distance education modules at both undergraduate and MA level. At this time too, he made significant contributions to the distance education modules for the MA in Applied Linguistics at Monash University, revising several modules in later years for online delivery.

Selected publications

Journal articles

Books

References

External links
 Monash University Staff Page; http://users.monash.edu.au/~kallan/homepage.html [Personal page]

Linguists from Australia
21st-century linguists
Semanticists
Linguistics journal editors
1943 births
Living people
Alumni of the University of Edinburgh